Sven Ingvar Buskenström (27 February 1919 - 11 March 1963) was a Swedish chess player, Swedish Chess Championship medalist (1962).

Biography
From the end 1950s to the start 1960s Sven Buskenström was one of the strongest chess players in Sweden. He participated in Swedish Chess Championship and won bronze medal in 1962. In 1963, Sven Buskenström participated in Stockholm International Chess tournament.

Sven Buskenström played for Sweden in the Chess Olympiads:
 In 1960, at second reserve board in the 14th Chess Olympiad in Leipzig (+5, =2, -2),
 In 1962, at fourth board in the 15th Chess Olympiad in Varna (+5, =3, -5).

References

External links

Sven Buskenström chess games at 365chess.com

1919 births
1963 deaths
Swedish chess players
Chess Olympiad competitors
20th-century chess players